Gigalimosina is a genus of flies belonging to the family Lesser Dung flies.

Species
G. flaviceps (Zetterstedt, 1847)

References

Sphaeroceridae
Diptera of Europe
Brachycera genera